Rockville is a small unincorporated community in northern-central Solano County, California, southwest of Fairfield and closest to Cordelia.

Yulyul, the main village of the Suisunes (a Patwin people of the Suisun Bay region), is believed to be where Rockville is located today.

The main economic activities are farming, tourism, and the large regional Rockville Cemetery.

Tourism

Rockville is the home of the Rockville Hills Regional Park, consisting of 633 acres of grasslands and oak woodlands, with a dense mixed broadleaf forest through which there are many hiking and biking trails.

References

External links

Rockville Hills Regional Park on Facebook

History
Article 'Preserving the past: Native heritage stands firm in county' by Adrienne Harris, published November 28, 2013 in the Fairfield Daily Republic
Article 'In search of Chief Solano / Suisun warrior vital part of local history' by Paul McHugh, published November 21, 2002 for The San Francisco Chronicle
Article 'Chief Solano’s grave site is shrouded in mystery', an archive of the monthly local history column "Solano In Retrospect" written by Nancy Dingler for the Daily Republic newspaper in Fairfield
Article 'Rockville Park - Site of Massacre in 1810' by Nancy Dingler for her monthly column "Solano in Retrospect", published September 22, 2000 in the Fairfield Daily Republic
Article 'Exploring a Mansion’s Storied Past: Part I of the Stonedene Story' by Sabine Goerke-Shrode, published August 3, 2003 in the Vacaville Reporter

Former Native American populated places in California
Unincorporated communities in California
Unincorporated communities in Solano County, California